The Smith & Wesson Governor is a snub-nosed (2.75 inch barrel) single-action/double-action revolver built on the Z-frame (a stretched N-frame) and utilizes a K-frame grip with a lightweight scandium alloy or stainless steel frame.

Design
Similar to the Taurus Judge, the Governor can fire  .410 shotgun shells, .45 Colt cartridges, and also .45 ACP cartridges with the use of supplied moon clips (due to the lack of a rim on the ACP cartridges).

The rear sights are fixed; similar to those found on the small J-Framed .38 Special and .357 Magnum as well as the medium-sized K-frame service revolvers. The front sights on both the standard and Crimson Trace models feature a tritium night sight that is drift-adjustable for windage corrections. It holds six rounds in any combination.

For a large handgun, the Governor is very lightweight—less than  unloaded—due to the alloys used in its construction.

Models 
Two versions of the alloy model are manufactured, the "iron sight" alloy Governor and the alloy model with the Crimson Trace laser sight.

There is a stainless steel version with open iron sights.

See also
 Bond Arms Derringer
 MIL Thunder 5

References

External links
 

Smith & Wesson revolvers
.45 ACP revolvers
.45 Colt firearms